The Jameson RJJ-1 Gipsy Hawk was a single-engine light aircraft intended to be homebuilt from plans.  The prototype was designed and constructed in the U.S. by Richard Jameson in the late 1960s-early 1970s.

Design and development

The Gypsy Hawk was an all-metal low wing monoplane, constructed throughout from light alloy angle spars and frames under a light alloy skin. The wings and tailplane had constant chord and square tips. There was a fuel tank in the outer panel of each wing. The all-moving tail was set at the extreme rear fuselage and had external mass balances and an anti-servo tab. The fin and rudder were further forward, swept and with a fillet to lead the fin into the strongly sloping upper fuselage.

The fuselage was a light alloy semi-monocoque with a nose-mounted 65 hp (48 kW) Continental A65  flat-four engine driving a fixed pitch, two-blade propeller. The single-seat cockpit placed the pilot over the wing under a two-piece blown canopy.  The Gypsy Hawk had a fixed, unfaired tricycle undercarriage.

Construction of the Gypsy Hawk began about 1968 and the first flight was in 1972.

Operational history
By the end of February 1974 the Gypsy Hawk had logged 200 hours of testing but there is no record of other examples.

By November 2012 the sole example was no longer registered in the United States with the Federal Aviation Administration and may no longer exist.

Specifications

References

External links

NACA 747A315 airfoil

1970s United States sport aircraft
Low-wing aircraft
Single-engined tractor aircraft
Aircraft first flown in 1972